Strychnos spinosa, the Natal orange, is a tree indigenous to tropical and subtropical Africa. It produces sweet-sour, yellow fruits, containing numerous hard brown seeds. Greenish-white flowers grow in dense heads at the ends of branches (Sep-Feb/Spring - summer). The fruits tend to appear only after good rains. It is related to the deadly Strychnos nux-vomica, which contains strychnine. The smooth, hard fruit are large and green, ripen to yellow colour. Inside the fruit are tightly packed seeds, which may be toxic, surrounded by a fleshy, brown, edible covering.
Animals such as baboon, monkeys, bushpig, nyala and eland eat the fruit. The leaves are a popular food source for browsers such as duiker, kudu, impala, steenbok, nyala and elephant.

Distribution
This tree can be found growing singly in well-drained soils. It is found in bushveld, riverine fringes, sand forest and coastal bush from the Eastern Cape to Kwazulu-Natal, northwards to Mozambique, and inland to Eswatini, Zimbabwe, parts of Zambia, northern Botswana, northern Namibia, Angola, Guinea Bissau, to tropical Africa, north west Madagascar, south east Madagascar at Sainte Luce Reserve, Southern Kenya on the lower parts of Eastern arc mountains, north west Ethiopia, and western Tigray at Kafta Sheraro National Park. It is able to grow in semi-arid and arid lands.

Traditional medicine
The plant, taken alone or in conjunction with extracts of other plants, is used by the Tiv people of Nigeria for snakebites, venereal disease, increasing the flow of breastmilk in lactating mothers, and enhancing physical strength.

Chemistry
An iridoid, sarracenin, has been isolated from the root bark of Strychnos spinosa.

References

External links
 
PlantZAfrica.com description
New Fruits for Arid Climates

FAO: State of Forest Genetic Resources in Kenya

Fruits originating in Africa
spinosa
Trees of Africa
Desert fruits